Hajra Masroor (born 17 January 1930, died 15 September 2012) was a Pakistani writer. Masroor established herself with her short fiction stories, known as afsana in Urdu literature. Her elder sister, Khadija Mastoor was also an accomplished short story writer and novelist.

Personal life
Hajra Masroor was born on 17 January 1930 in Lucknow, India to Dr. Syed Tahoor Ali Khan who was a British Army medical doctor. and had suddenly died after a heart attack. She had five sisters including another well-known writer Khadija Mastoor and a younger brother, Khalid Ahmad who also became a poet, playwright and a newspaper columnist. Her family was mainly raised by her mother. She began writing from her early childhood.

After independence of Pakistan in 1947, she and her sisters migrated to Pakistan, and settled in Lahore. An Urdu writer in his book wrote that no one knew Hajra was engaged with famous Urdu poet Sahir Ludhianvi but once in a literary gathering Ludhianvi pronounced a word wrongly, Hajra criticised him, he got angry and engagement was broken. Later, she married Ahmad Ali Khan, who was the editor of daily Dawn for 28 years. They were married for 57 years before he died in 2007. They have two daughters. She was younger sister of Khadija Mastoor, a noted writer in the history of Urdu literature.

Career
Hajra Masroor began writing short stories from an early age. Her short stories published in the literary magazines had received high appreciation from Urdu literary circles. She edited literary magazine Naqoosh with Ahmad Nadeem Qasmi. Qasmi was also a friend of hers and her sister. She made her place in the history of Urdu literature and Urdu fiction with bold imagination and writing of short stories in a non-traditional way. She wrote simple yet effective prose, had a down-to-earth style of writing.

She wrote several books of short stories in which she raised the social, political, legal, and economic rights for women equal to those of men. Hajra Masroor was one of the torchbearer of the Progressive Writers' Movement as well as one of the pioneers of feminism in the subcontinent.

Awards and recognition
Pride of Performance Award in 1995 by the President of Pakistan  
 Aalmi Frogh-e-Urdu Adab Award.

Death and legacy
Hajira Masroor died on 15 September 2012 in Karachi, Pakistan.

Bibliography
Short stories
 Chand Ke Doosri Taraf چاند کی دوسری طرف
 Tisri Manzil تیسری منزل
 Andhere Ujale اند ھیرے اُجالے
 Choori Chupe چوری چُھپے
 Ha-ai Allah ہائے اللہ
 Charkhay چرکے
 Woe Log وہ لوگ
 Charagh Ki Lau Per چراغ کی لو پر
 Sargoshian سرگوشیان
 Teesri Manzil تیسری منزل

Awards and achievements

See also
 List of Pakistani writers
 List of Urdu language writers
 List of people from Lahore

References

External links
 Awards
 Monthly Shair, Mumbai-March 2012-Hajra Masroor
 A Rare Picture-Naqoosh-1960
 A Rare Family Picture

1930 births
2012 deaths
Muhajir people
Nigar Award winners
Pakistani feminist writers
Pakistani magazine editors
Pakistani women short story writers
Pakistani short story writers
Writers from Lahore
Writers from Lucknow
Recipients of the Pride of Performance
20th-century Pakistani women writers
20th-century Pakistani writers
Women magazine editors